This page is an overview of Poland at the UCI Track Cycling World Championships.

List of medalists 
This a list of Polish medals won at the UCI Track World Championships.

Sources

Most successful Polish competitors

Medals by discipline
updated after the 2017 UCI Track Cycling World Championships

2015 UCI Track Cycling World Championships

Poland competed at the 2015 UCI Track Cycling World Championships in Saint-Quentin-en-Yvelines at the Vélodrome de Saint-Quentin-en-Yvelines from 18 to 22 February 2015. A team of 14 cyclists (6 women, 8 men) was announced to represent the country in the event.

Results

Men

Sources

Women

Sources

2016 UCI Track Cycling World Championships 

Poland competed at the 2016 UCI Track Cycling World Championships at the Lee Valley VeloPark in London, United Kingdom from 2–4 March 2016. A team of 17 cyclists (7 women, 10 men) was announced to represent the country in the event.

Results

Men

Sources

Women

Sources

See also
 Australia at the UCI Track Cycling World Championships
 Cuba at the UCI Track Cycling World Championships
 Netherlands at the UCI Track Cycling World Championships

References

Nations at the UCI Track Cycling World Championships
Poland at cycling events